Devon is a town in the Edmonton Metropolitan Region of Alberta, Canada.

History 

Devon owes its existence to one of the largest oil discoveries in the world. On February 13, 1947, the Imperial Leduc No. 1 well struck oil, and the new town of Devon was constructed shortly thereafter by Imperial Oil to accommodate its workers. The company was determined that the town would be well-planned, and Devon holds the distinction of being the first Canadian community to be approved by a regional planning commission. The oil industry remains a major player in the town's business sector, though the economy has diversified to include tourism, manufacturing, and research.

Devon is named after the Devonian formation (the strata tapped in the Leduc No. 1 oil well), which in turn is named for the county of Devon in England.

Climate 
Devon boasts a warm-summer humid continental climate (Köppen: Dfb), slightly cooler than Edmonton. On average at 3.6 days a year the temperature is above  days above  do not always occur, but on average four years in a decade. Days with temperatures below  occur every year on average 8.8 nights. In about 58.4% of the days of a year the temperature can reach a value less than or equal to the freezing temperature. Frost free will go from the beginning of June until the first week of September, usually. It corresponds in average to 96 days.

Demographics 

In the 2016 Census of Population conducted by Statistics Canada, the Town of Devon recorded a population of 6,578 living in 2,415 of its 2,493 total private dwellings, a  change from its 2011 population of 6,515.

The population of the Town of Devon according to its 2014 municipal census is 6,650, a  change from its 2009 municipal census population of 6,534.

Economy 
The Town of Devon was a member of the Leduc-Nisku Economic Development Association, an economic development partnership that markets Alberta's International Region in proximity to the Edmonton International Airport.

Amenities 

Devon is amply served by schools, community services such as the Devon General Hospital, and recreational facilities. It is located close to a motor sports park, a bird sanctuary, the University of Alberta Botanic Garden, and a number of other attractions to residents and visitors. Devon and area is popular with cyclists, as it has a good network of paved country roads, as well as unpaved mountain bike trails, and has hosted high level cycling events such as Canada's 2010 National Road Championships.

Schools 
Devon Christian School
Holy Spirit Catholic School
John Maland High School
Riverview Middle School
Robina Baker Elementary

Miscellaneous 
Devon is the sister city to Grimma, Germany. in 2008, a group of students and dignitaries from Devon travelled to Grimma to perform in an international music festival. In 2010, members of the Grimma Jugendblasorchester (Youth Orchestra) travelled to Devon to perform and to tour Alberta.

See also 
List of communities in Alberta
List of towns in Alberta

References

External links 

1949 establishments in Alberta
Edmonton Metropolitan Region
Leduc County
Populated places on the North Saskatchewan River
Towns in Alberta